Cressensac-Sarrazac is a commune in the Lot department in south-western France. It was established on 1 January 2019 by merger of the former communes of Cressensac (the seat) and Sarrazac.

See also

Communes of the Lot department

References

Communes of Lot (department)